Aldoma Bay (Russian: Zaliv Aldoma) is a small bay in the western Sea of Okhotsk. It is 8 km (5 mi) east to west and 14.5 km (9 mi) north to south. The Aldoma River flows into it from the west; to its east lies the Nurki Peninsula. It is considered the best anchorage in the northwestern part of the sea as it offers shelter from northeast winds.

History

American and Russian whaleships hunted bowhead whales in the bay in the 1850s and 1860s. They also anchored in the bay to get wood and water.

References

Bays of the Sea of Okhotsk
Bays of Khabarovsk Krai